Epiphractis is a genus of moths in the family Oecophoridae.

Species
Epiphractis amphitricha Meyrick, 1910 (from Mauritius)
Epiphractis aulica 	Meyrick, 1912 (from South Africa)
Epiphractis crocoplecta Meyrick, 1913 (from South Africa)
Epiphractis imbellis 	Meyrick, 1914 (from South Africa)
Epiphractis pauliani 	Viette, 1949 (from Madagascar)
Epiphractis phoenicis 	Meyrick, 1908 (from Angola)
Epiphractis rubricata 	Meyrick, 1913 (from South Africa)
Epiphractis sarcopa 	(Meyrick, 1909) (from South Africa)
Epiphractis speciosella 	Legrand, 1966 (from Seychelles)
Epiphractis superciliaris 	Meyrick, 1930 (from Sierra Leone)
Epiphractis thysanarcha 	Meyrick, 1918 (from South Africa)
Epiphractis tryphoxantha 	Meyrick, 1930 (from Mauritius)

References
Meyrick 1908b. Descriptions of African Micro-Lepidoptera. - Proceedings of the Zoological Society of London 1908:716–756 (on page 732)

 
Oecophorinae
Moth genera